Bigboy Matlapeng (born 4 February 1958) is a Botswanan long-distance runner. He competed in the marathon at the 1984 Summer Olympics and the 1988 Summer Olympics.

References

External links
 

1958 births
Living people
Athletes (track and field) at the 1984 Summer Olympics
Athletes (track and field) at the 1988 Summer Olympics
Botswana male long-distance runners
Botswana male marathon runners
Olympic athletes of Botswana
Commonwealth Games competitors for Botswana
Athletes (track and field) at the 1986 Commonwealth Games
Place of birth missing (living people)